Gornja Lapaštica is a village in the municipality of Medveđa, Serbia. According to the 2002 census, the village has a population of 194 people. Of these, 120 	(61,85 %) were ethnic Albanians, 68 (35,05 %) were Serbs, and 4 (2,06 %) others.

References

Populated places in Jablanica District
Albanian communities in Serbia